Domenico Antonio Galento (March 12, 1910 – July 22, 1979) was an American heavyweight boxer. He was nicknamed "Two Ton" after an explanation to his manager for nearly being late to one of his fights: "I had two tons of ice to deliver on my way here". Galento was one of the most colorful fighters in the history of the sport. He wrestled an octopus, and boxed a kangaroo as publicity stunts for his fights. He also boxed a 550 lb. (250 kg) bear, as a stage attraction.

Style
Galento was a "no holds barred" brawler. He would use his short stature to crouch and fade away from opponent's longer attacks, and also conceal explosive upwards attacks seemingly out of nowhere. Galento was a notoriously dirty fighter in the clinch, often ignoring the referee and engaging in fouls such as low blows.

Galento was also known to refrain from showering to encourage body odor in a strategy to distract his opponent. Max Baer commented "He smelled of rotten tuna and a tub of old liquor being sweated out".

Training
Galento, who said he was 5'9" (175 cm) tall, liked to weigh in at about 235 lb (107 kg) for his matches. He achieved this level of fitness by eating whatever, whenever he wanted. A typical meal for Galento consisted of six chickens, a side of spaghetti, all washed down with a half gallon of red wine, or beer, or both at one sitting. When he did go to training camp, he foiled his trainer's attempts to modify his diet, and terrorized his sparring partners by eating their meals in addition to his.

During his prime years as a boxer, he owned and operated a bar named "The Nut Club" in Orange, New Jersey. He was reputed to do his roadwork (training) after he closed the bar at 2:00 a.m. When asked why he trained at night, Galento replied, "Cuz I fight at night." 

He was also known to train on beer, and allegedly ate 52 hot dogs on a bet before facing heavyweight Arthur DeKuh. Galento was supposedly so bloated before the fight that the waist line of his trunks had to be slit for him to fit into them. Galento said he was sluggish from the effects of eating all those hot dogs, and that he could not move for three rounds. Nevertheless, Galento knocked out the 6'3" (192 cm) DeKuh with one punch, a left hook, in the fourth round.

Heavyweight championship
On June 28, 1939, Galento fought for the heavyweight championship of the world against Joe Louis. At this time, Louis was heavily favored (8 to 1) to stop Galento. Galento was not impressed. In a pre-fight interview, Galento summed up his perspective on the fight as follows:
Reporter: "Tony, what do you think your chances are against Joe Louis?"
Galento: "Joe who?"
Reporter: "Joe Louis."
Galento: "I never hoid of da bum."

He also predicted that he would "moida da bum", and telephoned Louis daily to personally inform him that he was a bum and that Galento would "moida him"—this colorful version of early tubthumping seems in retrospect to be Galento's standard manner of presentation (Look, March 14, 1939; Vol. 3, No. 6). Louis later said "He called me everything." Though known as a splendid self-promoter, Galento had the significant help of "Uncle" Mike Jacobs to sell the fight via ballyhoo. Jacobs frequently posed Galento for photo ops and news stories with beer bottles, steins and kegs; an openly clowning shot had Galento drinking from a milk bottle, with Jacobs trying to grab it away. Long before George Foreman was a cheeseburger-eating contender, Galento captured fans' imaginations as a challenger who trained on beer. It would seem almost necessary that, in order to show he was serious and properly prepared for the Louis fight, Galento stated that he had not taken alcohol for two days before the bout.

The two fought in Yankee Stadium in New York City. The short, balding Galento stunned the crowd, and his opponent, by staggering and hurting Louis with a powerful left hook in the first round. In the second round, Louis began hitting Galento with vicious combinations, opened a cut in Galento's mouth and floored the challenger with a powerful left hook that actually lifted Galento off his feet. This was the first time Galento had been knocked down in his professional career. In the third round, Louis was again hitting Galento with combinations when Galento caught him with a beautifully-timed inside left hook; this time Louis went down. Louis, however, got up quickly, but took no chances for the remainder of the round. The fourth round was brutal for Galento, who had no defense and was wide open for Louis' assault. Louis hit him with murderous combinations which forced the referee to stop the bout.

After the fight, Galento was inconsolable.  Whitey Bimstein, acting cut man:  ... he is sitting there with blood pouring from his eyes, his nose and his cheek. He won't let me touch the cuts. He won't let me take off his gloves He pushes me away every time I try to do something for him, and bellows, "You guys wouldn't let me fight my own fight. I'd've knocked that mug cold."  Galento contended throughout life that his trainers convinced him to change styles, and to fight cleanly; he regretted he did not fight "his" fight and foul Louis. Only a year after the Louis fight, Bimstein offered a different perspective, asserting the bob and weave Galento adopted in the first two rounds was working, citing the knockdown of Louis in the second frame as proof. "Then [Galento] thought he was John L. Sullivan, and came up straight to slug", said Bimstein, "and you just can't do that with Louis."

Louis and Galento appeared together on The Way It Was, a sports nostalgia program (PBS), on January 29, 1976.  The episode was lively, due to Galento's still-direct and colorful style of engagement. Louis showed a surprising side of himself when, after fending off a question by veteran fight commentator Don Dunphy, regarding any ill feeling vs. Max Schmeling (Louis stating he and Schmeling had not truly been adversaries but indeed "good friends"), he then pointed at Galento and stated, "But that little fellow ... he really got me mad. All those mean things he said about me while training for our fight. He got me mad, all right."  Louis furthered this statement by revealing that his anger by fight time was such that he had decided to "carry" Galento, i.e. to drag the fight out in order to "punish him for those nasty things". After suffering the knockdown, however, Louis changed his mind: "[Galento] hit too hard.  So I knocked him out as quickly as I could."

Other fights
Galento's other two famous fights were with former champion Max Baer, and contender Lou Nova. The Nova fight is reputed to be one of the dirtiest and bloodiest fights ever fought. Nova was knocked down five times. Galento kneed, butted, gouged, hit below the belt, and on at least two knockdowns, Galento "fell" with his 230 lb (104 kg) on Nova, knees first. Referee George Blake finally stopped the mayhem at 2:44 of the 14th round.

Galento's fight with Max Baer ended when the referee stopped the bout in the eighth round. On the day of the Baer fight, Galento decided to first stop off at his bar. There he had a big bowl of spaghetti with meat balls, washed down with half a case of beer. After his meal, Galento became embroiled in an argument with his brother. The dispute ended when his brother threw his beer glass in Galento's face, severely cutting his lip. Galento was forced to get the cut stitched up, hours before the fight. Baer re-opened the cut in the first round, forcing Galento to swallow blood for the remainder of the fight. After the fight, Galento blamed his inability to "hook him around the head and butt him" for the loss. His record was 80–26–5 with 57 knockouts.

Less known is Galento's battle with Ernie Schaaf in 1932 (Newark).  Schaaf was at the time ranked No. 3 by The Ring, and the fight was considered a stepping stone to a title fight with then-champion Jack Sharkey. The fight seemed jinxed from the first, however, rained out three times before finally taking place. It went the scheduled 10-round distance, but was a seesaw affair, rife with brutal infighting and containing many illegal blows. "Two-Ton Tony" repeatedly struck Schaaf behind the neck with right hand chops ('rabbit punches').  Schaaf, who recovered quickly, was stronger at the end and won the decision, but did not leave his dressing room table for long hours, while Galento merely collected his purse and went home.  Schaaf's career spiraled down, culminating in a harrowing beating from Max Baer, followed by his death from light blows early in his final fight, vs. Primo Carnera.  Fight lore has long held Baer's devastating right hand responsible for the ring death of Schaaf, but in the hardline culture of the 1930s, Newark sportswriters were quick to claim Galento and the above battle-royal as having done the telling damage.

Professional boxing record

Retirement
Galento retired from boxing in 1943, and applied his talents to the world of professional wrestling. He also turned to acting, and was given roles in Wind Across The Everglades (1958), The Best Things in Life Are Free (1956), Guys and Dolls (1955) and On the Waterfront (1954).  He retained a kind of "folk hero" status, and was profiled several times, once by W.C. Heinz in TRUE Magazine (AUGUST, 1960; VOL. 41, NO. 279).

Galento was interred in St. Johns Catholic Cemetery in Orange, New Jersey.

Filmography

References

Bibliography

External links
 
Biography
Article on Galento's unique style
 

1910 births
1979 deaths
American professional wrestlers of Italian descent
American people of Italian descent
Heavyweight boxers
People from Orange, New Jersey
American male professional wrestlers
Burials in New Jersey
20th-century American male actors
American male boxers
Boxers from New Jersey